Oscar Comettant (18 April 1819 – 24 January 1898) was a 19th-century French composer, musicologist and traveller.

Biography 
Commettant studied the piano and musical composition at the Conservatoire de Paris (1839–1843) and made a long tour in the United-States from 1852 to 1855 as a soloist.

He left Le Havre on 1 September 1852 and arrived in New York City on the 13th. He then visited the Niagara Falls, Mammoth Cave, saw the Mississippi, Lake Superior, Cedar Creek, among other places.

His circuit began on a steamer on the Hudson River. The train then led him from Albany to Buffalo, with a stop at Niagara Falls. He went to Toronto, Kingston, Mille-Isles, and Montréal, then south to Saratoga and returned to New York where he rested for two weeks.

Comettant later visited Philadelphia, Washington, D.C., Richmond (Virginia), and Charleston, then spent a month in Mobile in a cotton plantation. On his way to New Orleans, he sailed on the Mississippi and went through Vicksburg, Memphis and Louisville, where he took the opportunity to admire Mammoth Cave and ended his journey by Cincinnati and Pittsburgh.

Unlike many travelers, Comettant focused on American society and institutions; the great spaces of nature were indifferent to him. Although very detailed on political life, religions, education etc. and the American cod, his works, where he invented the character of the French painter Marcel Bonneau, were fictional.

In 1855, on his return to France, he became a professor of music; while composing, he worked as a music critic for Le Siècle and Le Ménestrel.

Comettant went again on a journey in 1864 and visited Denmark, then in July 1888 was appointed French juror at the Melbourne Centennial Exhibition (1888) where he arrived 6 September after he left Marseille 1 August.

He visited Lilydale where he met squatters and Indigenous Australians and, in October 1888, the mines of Ballarat and Sandhurst. He also traveled in the Great Western, where he admired the vines before going to Sydney to attend a banquet (December).

After composing his "Salute to Melbourne" for piano, he returned to France on 28 December 1888.

Publications 
1858: Trois ans aux États-Unis. Étude des mœurs et coutumes américaines
1861: Le Nouveau Monde. Scènes de la vie américaine
1861: Les Secrets de la mer, short story
1862: Physiologie du mal de mer
1863: Les Civilisations inconnues
1864: L'Amérique telle qu'elle est. Voyage anecdotique de M. Bonneau dans le nord et le sud des États-Unis. Excursion au Canada
1864: En vacances
1865: En Amérique, en France et Ailleurs
1865: Le Danemark tel qu'il est
1865: Un Petit rien tout neuf
1866: Voyage pittoresque et anecdotique dans le nord et le sud des États-Unis d'Amérique
1868: De haut en bas, impressions pyrénéennes
1868: Gustave Lambert au Pôle Nord, ce qu'il y va faire
1869: De Paris à quelque part
1883: Histoires de bonne humeur
1890: Au pays des kangourous et des mines d'or. Étude des mœurs et coutumes australiennes, impressions de voyage1895: L'homme et les bêtes, moral studies

 Musicology 
1857: La Propriété intellectuelle au point de vue de la morale et du progrès1860: Histoire d'un inventeur au XIXe siècle. Adolphe Sax, ses ouvrages et ses luttes1862: Musique et musiciens1869: La musique, les musiciens et les instruments de musique chez les différents peuples du monde1870: Les Musiciens, les philosophes et les gaietés de la musique en chiffres1875: Comédies en quatre lignes1875: Francis Planté, portrait musical à la plume1877: Enseignement du piano. Le Guide-mains W. Bohrer. Notice illustrée de deux dessins, explications et conseils sur l'emploi du Guide-mains W. Bohrer1883: Les Compositeurs illustres de notre siècle : Rossini, Meyerbeer, Mendelssohn, Halévy, Gounod, Félicien David1885: Un Nid d'autographes. Lettres inédites recueillies et annotées par Oscar Comettant1889: La Norvège musicale à Paris1890: Histoire de cent mille pianos et d'une salle de concert1891: La Hollande musicale à Paris1894: La musique de la garde républicaine en Amérique1894–1898 La Musique de chambre, 6 vols.

 Compositions 

1841: Un Vieux grognard, Fantastic interlude in one act, lyrics by Théophile Mercier
1844: L'Aigle !, imperial quadrille with quartet accompaniment for piano
1844: Faisons-nous belle, bolero, lyrics by Adolphe Favre
1844: Oh ! si tu le voulais !, romance, lyrics by Louise Colet
1844: Un Rayon de Dieu, melody, lyrics by Adolphe Favre
1846: Le Chant de la syrène, melody, lyrics by Alfred Des Essarts
1846: Jeanne d'Arc, scene and air, lyrics by Alfred des Essarts
1846: La Plainte d'Ariane, drama melody for soprano, lyrics by Alfred des Essarts
1848: La Danse au bois, ditty, lyrics by Adolphe Favre
1848: Marinetta la fiancée, barcarolle, lyrics by Adolphe Favre
1849: L'Exilée au Texas, melody
1849: Raphaël au tombeau de Julie, melody
1850: Élégie pour piano et violon, Op. 35
1850: Fantaisie de concert pour piano et violon, Op. 33
1851: Andante, scherzo and final for piano. Op. 48
1851: École mélodique du jeune pianiste, 12 études récréatives pour former les élèves au style expressif et chantant, op. 55
1851: Fantaisie brillante pour piano sur l'Enfant Prodigue, de D. F. E. Auber, Op. 56
1851: God Save the queen, caprice for piano. Op. 39
1851: Une nuit à Smyrne, oriental fantasy for piano. Op. 42
1851: Les petits Oiseaux, three easy waltz for the piano
1851: Rule Britannia, fantasy for piano
1851: Souvenir de Gisors, waltz for the piano
1852: Casilda, small fantasy for piano for small hands. Op. 60
1852: Fantaisie brillante sur le Juif errant, de F. Halévy, for the piano. op. 63
1852: Fantaisie sur l'opéra Mosquita la Sorcière, de X Boisselot, for piano. Op. 58
1852: Le Troubadour du Pérou, eight Spanish romances
1852: La Vision, polka mazurka for piano
1856: Chanson de l'Oncle Tom, study for piano
1856: Appassionato, new study of salon for piano
1856: Choral américain, miscellany for piano
1856: Élan du cœur, study for piano
1856: Rêverie harmonieuse, study for piano
1856: Sur le lac, study for piano
1857: Banjo, caprice, piano
1857: L'Amazone, polka for piano
1857: Le Cor de chasse, polka for piano
1857: Edda !, polka-mazurka for piano
1857: Églantine !, schottisch for piano
1857: La Fin du bal !, galop for piano
1857: La Noce au village, quadrille for piano
1857: Nymphe des nuits, waltz for piano
1860: L'Inconstance !, great piano waltz for piano
1861: Un ballo in maschera, opéra de Verdi, caprice de Salon for piano
1861: Tantum ergo pour voix de baryton ou mezzo-Soprano1861: Le Traîneau !, waltz for piano
1862: Alceste, opéra de Gluck, Temple scene arranged for piano
1863: Les Nuits de Bohème, characteristic march for the piano
1863: La Gamme des amours, variations on a known theme
1871: Metz. Hymne de Gaston Hirsch1872: Alsace et Lorraine, march, piano
1873: Heures d'harmonie, little pieces for piano
1876: La beauté provençale, waltz, piano
1879: La Sympathie, sentimental waltz, Op.162
1888: Berceuse, piano
1888 Chœur nocturne, nocturne, piano
1888: Scherzetto pastoral, piano
1888: Impromptu-Caprice, piano (1888)
1888: Simplesse, piano (1888)
1888: Bergerie !, choir for two voices of women, accompanied by piano, lyrics by Oscar Comettant, music by Renaud-Maury
1888: Villanelle rythmique, piano
1889: Salut à Melbourne !, piano
1889: Bagatelle, lyrics and music
1889: Le Sydney, sea song (with choir ad libitum)
1890: Les cinq cousines, piano
1892: Allegro de salon, piano
1892: Le petit Trianon, piano
1892: Impromptu, piano
1892: Rondeau villageois, piano
1892: Menuet, piano
1892: Christina !, polka mazurka composed for the piano
1898 Aux absents, piano
1898: Impressions d'une nuit d'été, piano
1898: La permission des quintes, piano
1898: Trois Méditations musicales pour piano1907: Eoline, piano. Op. 37
 Six études de salon, piano. Op. 32 (undated)
 Fantaisie caprice pour piano sur Zerline ou la Corbeille d'oranges, by D. F. E. Auber. Op. 57 (undated)
 Le Pardon de Ploërmel, de Meyerbeer, transcription-fantasy for piano (undated)

 Bibliography 
1870: Gustave Vapereau, Dictionnaire universel des contemporains, Hachette,  read on line 
1995:  with an 1860 photograph.
1999: Numa Broc, Dictionnaire des Explorateurs français du XIXe siècle'', T.3, Amérique, CTHS, 
2005: Jean Roy, « Comettant (Oscar) », in

References

External links 
 Oscar Comettant on Encyclopédie Larouse
 Oscar Comettant on Médias 19
 Festival commémoratif d’Hector Berlioz by Oscar Comettant on Site Hector Berloz (Le Ménestrel 27 mars 1870, p. 130-2)
 Online Books by Oscar Comettant on The Online Books Page
 Oscar Comettant's discography on Discogs
 Comettant Oscar on IMSLP

French classical composers
French male classical composers
19th-century French musicologists
French explorers
1819 births
Musicians from Bordeaux
1898 deaths
19th-century French male musicians
19th-century musicologists